Mary Walker may refer to:
 Mary Richardson Walker (1811–1877), American missionary
 Mary Chase Walker (1828–1899), American schoolteacher, pioneer, and suffragette
 Mary Edwards Walker (1832–1919), American physician and Medal of Honor recipient
 Mary Ann Walker (1845–1888), Whitechapel murder victim
 Mary Hardway Walker (1848–1969), Early civil rights activist and educator, resident of Chattanooga USA.
 Mary Lily Walker (1863–1913), Scottish social reformer
 Mary Broadfoot Walker (1888–1974), British physician
 Mary Willis Walker (born 1942), crime fiction author
 Mary L. Walker (born 1948), lawyer
 Mary Walker, the alter-ego of the comic book character Typhoid Mary (comics)
 Mary Walker (rodeo) (born 1959), world champion barrel racer
 Mary Shore Walker (1882–1952), American mathematician
 Mary Hardway Walker, (1848-1969), from Chattanooga, Tennessee, one of last surviving American slaves
 Mary "Mollie" Walker, MBE (born 1909), Welsh supercentenarian, oldest living person in the United Kingdom

See also
 Mary Walker-Sawka (born c. 1916), Canadian film producer
 Mary Walker Phillips (1923–2007), American artist, author and educator